9-1-1 is an American procedural television series created by Ryan Murphy, Brad Falchuk, and Tim Minear for the Fox Broadcasting Company. The series follows the lives of Los Angeles first responders: police officers, paramedics, firefighters, and dispatchers.

The series stars Angela Bassett, Peter Krause, Oliver Stark, Aisha Hinds, Kenneth Choi, Rockmond Dunbar, Connie Britton, Jennifer Love Hewitt, Ryan Guzman, Corinne Massiah, Marcanthonee Jon Reis, Gavin McHugh, and John Harlan Kim. The series premiered on January 3, 2018.  9-1-1 is a joint production between Reamworks, Brad Falchuk Teley-Vision and Ryan Murphy Television in association with 20th Television. In March 2019, Fox renewed the series for a third season, which premiered on September 23, 2019. In April 2020, Fox renewed the series for a fourth season, which premiered on January 18, 2021. In May 2021, the series was renewed for a fifth season, which premiered on September 20, 2021. In May 2022, the series was renewed for a sixth season, which premiered on September 19, 2022.

Cast and characters

 Angela Bassett as Athena Grant-Nash (née Carter), LAPD patrol sergeant, Bobby's wife 
 Peter Krause as Robert "Bobby" Nash, LAFD Station 118 captain, Athena's husband
 Oliver Stark as Evan "Buck" Buckley, firefighter, Maddie's brother  
 Aisha Hinds as Henrietta "Hen" Wilson, firefighter and paramedic 
 Kenneth Choi as Howard "Howie"/"Chimney" Han, firefighter and paramedic 
 Rockmond Dunbar as Michael Grant, Athena's ex-husband (seasons 1–5)
 Connie Britton as Abigail "Abby" Clark, 911 operator (season 1; special guest season 3)
 Jennifer Love Hewitt as Maddie Buckley (formerly Kendall), Buck's sister, and a trained nurse. She comes to Los Angeles and becomes a 911 operator (season 2–present) 
 Ryan Guzman as Edmundo "Eddie" Díaz, firefighter and paramedic (season 2–present)
 Corinne Massiah as May Grant, Athena and Michael's daughter, Bobby's stepdaughter (season 2–present; recurring season 1)
 Marcanthonee Jon Reis as Harry Grant, Athena and Michael's son, Bobby's stepson (seasons 2–6; recurring season 1)
 Gavin McHugh as Christopher Díaz, Eddie's son (season 3–present; recurring season 2)
 John Harlan Kim as Albert Han, Chimney’s half-brother (season 4; guest seasons 3, 6, recurring season 5)

Episodes

Production

Development
The series is produced by 20th Television (formerly 20th Century Fox Television), with Murphy, Falchuk, Minear, and Bradley Buecker as executive producers along with cast members Angela Bassett and Peter Krause. Minear also serves as showrunner and Buecker directed the premiere episode. On January 16, 2018, Fox renewed the series for an eighteen-episode second season. The second season premiered with a special episode on Sunday, September 23, 2018, at 8 p.m. EDT; the second episode aired in the series's regular 9 p.m. EDT time slot on Monday, September 24, 2018.  On March 25, 2019, Fox renewed the series for a third season which premiered on September 23, 2019. On April 13, 2020, Fox renewed the series for a fourth season which premiered on January 18, 2021. On May 17, 2021, Fox renewed the series for a fifth season which premiered on September 20, 2021. On May 16, 2022, Fox renewed the series for a sixth season which premiered on September 19, 2022.

The series received the ReFrame Stamp for gender-balanced hiring.

Casting
In October 2017, Connie Britton, Angela Bassett, and Peter Krause joined the main cast. Later that month, it was announced that Oliver Stark, Aisha Hinds, Kenneth Choi, and Rockmond Dunbar had been cast in regular roles.

On May 14, 2018, it was announced that Jennifer Love Hewitt would join the main cast as Maddie Buckley, Buck's sister, in season 2, replacing the role of Britton's character Abby Clark. On May 23, 2018, Fox announced that Ryan Guzman would be joining the second season of the series as new firefighter Eddie Díaz. On June 4, 2018, it was announced that Corinne Massiah and Marcanthonnee Jon Reis, who play May and Harry Grant, had been promoted, from their recurring roles in season 1, to series regulars for season 2. Gavin McHugh, who plays Eddie's son Christopher, was promoted to a series regular in season 3, after recurring in season 2. Britton returned in the finale of the third season as a special guest star, reprising her role as Abby Clark. In season 5, Dunbar departed over the COVID-19 vaccine mandate implemented by 20th Television after his requests for medical and religious exemptions were denied. In February 2022, Arielle Kebbel joined the cast in recurring role that same season.

Syndication 
Reruns began airing on USA Network starting on January 5, 2022.

Reception

Critical response

On Rotten Tomatoes, the first season has an approval rating of 70%, based on 33 reviews, with an average rating of 5.90/10. The website's critical consensus reads, "9-1-1 occasionally veers into melodrama, but is redeemed with a top-tier cast, adrenaline-pumping action, and a dash of trashy camp that pushes the show into addictive guilty pleasure territory." Metacritic, which uses a weighted average, assigned a score of 60 out of 100 based on reviews from 21 critics, indicating "mixed or average reviews".

Amy Amatangelo of Paste praised the disasters depicted across the series and the action sequences, applauded Angela Bassett's performance and her character's storyline, while complimenting the development of the characters across their relationships. Steve Greene of IndieWire called 9-1-1 a perfect hit, stating the show manages to feel realistic and emotional across its dialogues and the relationships between the characters, applauded the action sequences with the different disasters, and praised the performances of the cast. Daniel Fieinberg of The Hollywood Reporter found the series to be a conventional yet solid procedural drama, comparing it to the Chicago franchise, and applauded the performances of the cast, while calling the characters decent.

Suzi Feay of Financial Times rated the first season 4 out of 5 stars, called it an intense and juddering drama series across its emergency calls, and stated 9-1-1 has the potential to become a classic of the "hero genre". Melissa Camacho of Common Sense Media gave season one 3 out of 5 stars, complimented the depiction of positive messages and role models, stating the series depicts how difficult, traumatic, and personally fulfilling being a first responder can be across its characters, while calling the series solid overall.

On Rotten Tomatoes, the second season has an approval rating of 100%, based on 7 reviews, with an average rating of 7.75/10.

Brian Grubb of Uproxx stated the second season of the series manages to be more ambitious than the first one, applauding the disasters and action sequences, and praised the performances of the cast and the development of the characters.

On Rotten Tomatoes, the third season has an approval rating of 75%, based on 8 reviews, with an average rating of 6.5/10.

Ratings

Accolades

Spin-off

On May 12, 2019, it was announced that a spin-off, titled 9-1-1: Lone Star, would premiere on January 19, 2020, immediately following the NFC Championship game and continue the following night, January 20, 2020. On the same day, Rob Lowe was announced to star. In September, Liv Tyler, Ronen Rubinstein, Sierra McClain, Jim Parrack, Natacha Karam, Brian Michael Smith, Julian Works, and Rafael Silva were also announced to star in the series alongside Lowe.

Due to COVID-19 concerns, Liv Tyler did not return for the second season. Gina Torres was introduced in a regular role.

Notes

References

External links

 
 

 
2010s American LGBT-related drama television series
2010s American police procedural television series
2010s American workplace drama television series
2018 American television series debuts
2020s American LGBT-related drama television series
2020s American police procedural television series
2020s American workplace drama television series
20th Television franchises
American action television series
Emergency medical responders
English-language television shows
Fictional portrayals of the Los Angeles Police Department
Fox Broadcasting Company original programming
Television series about firefighting
Television series by 20th Century Fox Television
Television series created by Brad Falchuk
Television series created by Ryan Murphy (writer)
Television shows set in California
Television shows set in Los Angeles